Lauryl methyl gluceth-10 hydroxypropyl dimonium chloride is an ingredient in some types of soaps and personal care products. It is used as a substantive conditioning humectant. 
This chemical is a type of methyl glucoside derivative, which has been modified by ethoxylation and quaternization. A synthetic pathway for lauryl methyl gluceth-10
hydroxypropyldimonium chloride and other methyl glucoside humectants has been outlined in trade literature.

Lauryl methyl gluceth-10 hydroxypropyldimonium chloride is listed as a trade-named raw material, Glucquat 125, in cosmetic and toiletry products.

References

Cationic surfactants
Polyethers